Džamila Stehlíková, née Ordabayeva (born 6 February 1962, in Almaty) is a Kazakh-born Czech politician and a doctor. She is a member of the Czech Green Party (Czech Green Party), and was the Minister for Human Rights and Minorities from 2007 to 2009.

Stehlíková is a naturalized Czech citizen by marriage. On 17 February 1992, Stehlíková was sworn in as a Czech citizen.

External links 
 Homepage

Government ministers of the Czech Republic
Czech people of Kazakhstani descent
People from Almaty
1962 births
Living people
Women government ministers of the Czech Republic
Green Party (Czech Republic) Government ministers
Soviet emigrants to Czechoslovakia
Czech LGBT rights activists
Czech feminists
Czech psychiatrists
21st-century Czech women politicians